Gagrella is a large genus of harvestmen in the family Sclerosomatidae from Asia.

Species

 Gagrella aenescens Thorell, 1889
 Gagrella aenigra Roewer, 1954
 Gagrella albertisii Thorell, 1876
 Gagrella albicoxata Roewer, 1954
 Gagrella albifrons Roewer, 1915
 Gagrella albipunctata Suzuki, 1977
 Gagrella amboinensis (Doleschall, 1857)
 Gagrella annapurnica J. Martens, 1987
 Gagrella annulatipes Roewer, 1912
 Gagrella aorana Roewer, 1954
 Gagrella apoensis Suzuki, 1977
 Gagrella argentea Roewer, 1913
 Gagrella armillata Thorell, 1889
 Gagrella arthrocentra Roewer, 1910
 Gagrella asperula (Roewer, 1955)
 Gagrella atra (Roewer, 1929)
 Gagrella atrata Stoliczka, 1869
 Gagrella atrorubra Simon, 1901
 Gagrella aura 
 Gagrella aurantiaca (Roewer, 1929)
 Gagrella aureolata Roewer, 1915
 Gagrella aurispina Roewer, 1954
 Gagrella auromaculata Roewer, 1954
 Gagrella auroscutata Roewer, 1954
 Gagrella beauforti Roewer, 1911
 Gagrella bella Roewer, 1954
 Gagrella bengalica Roewer, 1954
 Gagrella biarmata Roewer, 1954
 Gagrella bicolor (Roewer, 1915)
 Gagrella bicolorispina Roewer, 1954
 Gagrella binotata Simon, 1887
 Gagrella biseriata Simon, 1901
 Gagrella biseriata (Roewer, 1912) (Homonym)
 Gagrella borneoensis Roewer, 1954
 Gagrella brunnea Roewer, 1954
 Gagrella buruana Roewer, 1954
 Gagrella caerulea Roewer, 1910
 Gagrella cana Roewer, 1954
 Gagrella carinia Roewer, 1936
 Gagrella ceramensis Roewer, 1911
 Gagrella cerata Roewer, 1913
 Gagrella cervina Simon, 1887
 Gagrella ceylonensis Karsch, 1891
 Gagrella cinctipes (Banks, 1930)
 Gagrella cinerascens Roewer, 1910
 Gagrella concinna Thorell, 1891
 Gagrella coriacea Roewer, 1910
 Gagrella corrugata Roewer, 1954
 Gagrella crassitarsis Suzuki, 1970
 Gagrella cruciata Roewer, 1923
 Gagrella cuprea Roewer, 1910
 Gagrella cuprinitens Roewer, 1954
 Gagrella curuanica S. Suzuki, 1982
 Gagrella curvispina Roewer, 1913
 Gagrella cyanargentea Roewer, 1915
 Gagrella cyanatra Roewer, 1954
 Gagrella delicatula Roewer, 1954
 Gagrella denticulata S.Suzuki, 1976
 Gagrella denticulatifrons Roewer, 1954
 Gagrella diluta (Roewer, 1929)
 Gagrella disticta Thorell, 1889
 Gagrella dubia Giltay, 1930
 Gagrella duplex Roewer, 1915
 Gagrella elegans Simon, 1877
 Gagrella ephippiata Thorell, 1891
 Gagrella erebea Thorell, 1889
 Gagrella feae Thorell, 1889
 Gagrella figurata (Roewer, 1923)
 Gagrella flava Roewer, 1910
 Gagrella flavimaculata With, 1903
 Gagrella fokiensis Roewer, 1954
 Gagrella foveolata Roewer, 1923
 Gagrella fragilis With, 1903
 Gagrella franzi J. Martens, 1987
 Gagrella fulva Roewer, 1910
 Gagrella fuscipes Roewer, 1910
 Gagrella godavariensis Suzuki, 1970
 Gagrella gracilis (Roewer, 1910)
 Gagrella grandissima Mello-Leitão, 1944
 Gagrella grandis (Roewer, 1910)
 Gagrella granobunus Roewer, 1954
 Gagrella granulata (Roewer, 1954)
 Gagrella gravelyi Roewer, 1912
 Gagrella grisea Roewer, 1911
 Gagrella guttata Karsch, 1881
 Gagrella hainanensis Roewer, 1911
 Gagrella hansenii With, 1903
 Gagrella hasseltii Thorell, 1891
 Gagrella heinrichi Roewer, 1954
 Gagrella hirta With, 1903
 Gagrella histrionica Thorell, 1889
 Gagrella impressata (Roewer, 1955)
 Gagrella indochinensis Roewer, 1927
 Gagrella infuscata Roewer, 1911
 Gagrella insculpta Pocock, 1897
 Gagrella insulana Roewer, 1954
 Gagrella iwamasai Suzuki, 1977
 Gagrella javana (Roewer, 1954)
 Gagrella kanaria (Roewer, 1929)
 Gagrella laciniipes (Roewer, 1955)
 Gagrella lateitia Roewer, 1954
 Gagrella leopoldi Giltay, 1930
 Gagrella lepida Thorell, 1889
 Gagrella leucobunus Roewer, 1912
 Gagrella leucobunus (Roewer, 1954) Homonym
 Gagrella lineatipes Roewer, 1911
 Gagrella longipalpis Thorell, 1891
 Gagrella longipes S. Suzuki, 1982
 Gagrella longispina Roewer, 1913
 Gagrella luteofrontalis Roewer, 1910
 Gagrella luteomaculata S. Suzuki, 1982
 Gagrella luzonica Loman, 1902
 Gagrella maculipes (Banks, 1930)
 Gagrella magnifica Roewer, 1910
 Gagrella maindroni Simon, 1897
 Gagrella malabarica Roewer, 1954
 Gagrella malkini Suzuki, 1977
 Gagrella marginata Roewer, 1954
 Gagrella matherania (Roewer, 1915)
 Gagrella melanobunus Suzuki, 1977
 Gagrella mertoni Strand, 1911
 Gagrella mindanaoensis Suzuki, 1977
 Gagrella minuta Roewer, 1954
 Gagrella mjobergi (Banks, 1930)
 Gagrella moluccana (Roewer, 1954)
 Gagrella monticola Thorell, 1891
 Gagrella natuna Roewer, 1912
 Gagrella neocera Forster, 1949
 Gagrella nigerrima (Roewer, 1910)
 Gagrella nigra (Roewer, 1955)
 Gagrella nigrescens Roewer, 1954
 Gagrella nigripalpis Roewer, 1910
 Gagrella nigripes (Banks, 1930)
 Gagrella niponica Roewer, 1954
 Gagrella nobilis With, 1903
 Gagrella nocticolor Thorell, 1889
 Gagrella obscura Simon, 1877
 Gagrella ochracea (Roewer, 1954)
 Gagrella ochroleuca Roewer, 1954
 Gagrella opaca Roewer, 1954
 Gagrella orientalis (Roewer, 1954)
 Gagrella ornata Roewer, 1910
 Gagrella ovata (Sato & Suzuki, 1938)
 Gagrella pahangia (Roewer, 1954)
 Gagrella palawanica Suzuki, 1977
 Gagrella parallela Roewer, 1931
 Gagrella patalungensis Simon, 1901
 Gagrella paupera With, 1905
 Gagrella peguana (Roewer, 1955)
 Gagrella perfecta (Roewer, 1954)
 Gagrella plebeja (Thorell, 1889)
 Gagrella prasina Roewer, 1911
 Gagrella pretiosa (Banks, 1930)
 Gagrella promeana Roewer, 1954
 Gagrella pullata Thorell, 1891
 Gagrella pumilio Karsch, 1881
 Gagrella punctata Roewer, 1954
 Gagrella quadrimaculata Roewer, 1954
 Gagrella quadriseiata Roewer, 1954
 Gagrella quadrivittata Simon, 1887
 Gagrella reticulata Suzuki, 1977
 Gagrella reunionis (Roewer, 1954)
 Gagrella rorida Roewer, 1954
 Gagrella rubra (Roewer, 1910)
 Gagrella rufa Roewer, 1954
 Gagrella rugosa (Roewer, 1955)
 Gagrella sadona Roewer, 1954
 Gagrella sampitia Roewer, 1954
 Gagrella sarasinorum Roewer, 1913
 Gagrella sarawakensis With, 1905
 Gagrella satarana Roewer, 1954
 Gagrella satoi (Roewer, 1955)
 Gagrella scabra Roewer, 1912
 Gagrella scintillans Roewer, 1910
 Gagrella scorbiculata Thorell, 1891
 Gagrella scutaurea Roewer, 1954
 Gagrella semangkokensis Suzuki, 1972
 Gagrella semigranosa Simon, 1901
 Gagrella serrulata Roewer, 1910
 Gagrella sexmaculata Suzuki, 1970
 Gagrella sherriffsi Roewer, 1954
 Gagrella signata Stoliczka, 1869
 Gagrella similaris (Roewer, 1955)
 Gagrella similis (Roewer, 1911)
 Gagrella similis Suzuki, 1977 (Homonym)
 Gagrella sinensis Roewer, 1954
 Gagrella speciosa (Roewer, 1912) (Homonym)
 Gagrella speciosa Roewer, 1911
 Gagrella spinacantha Roewer, 1936
 Gagrella spinoculata Roewer, 1931
 Gagrella spinulosa Thorell, 1889
 Gagrella splendens With, 1903
 Gagrella strinatii (Silhavý, 1974)
 Gagrella subfusca Roewer, 1910
 Gagrella sulphurea Roewer, 1912
 Gagrella suluana Roewer, 1954
 Gagrella sumatrana (S. Suzuki, 1982)
 Gagrella sumba Roewer, 1954
 Gagrella tenuipalpis Suzuki, 1977
 Gagrella testacea Roewer, 1954
 Gagrella thaiensis S. Suzuki, 1982
 Gagrella thienemanni (Roewer, 1931)
 Gagrella thorelli (Banks, 1930)
 Gagrella tibialis Roewer, 1931
 Gagrella tinjurae J. Martens, 1987
 Gagrella transversalis (Roewer, 1912)
 Gagrella triangularis With, 1903
 Gagrella tricolor Roewer, 1954
 Gagrella tristis (Thorell, 1889)
 Gagrella trochanteralis (Roewer, 1955)
 Gagrella tuberculata Roewer, 1913
 Gagrella turki Roewer, 1954
 Gagrella unicolor (Roewer, 1912)
 Gagrella unispinosa With, 1903
 Gagrella varians With, 1903
 Gagrella victoria Roewer, 1954
 Gagrella viridalba Roewer, 1954
 Gagrella viridargentea Roewer, 1954
 Gagrella vittata (Roewe, 1910)
 Gagrella vulcanica (Doleschall, 1857)
 Gagrella wangi (Zhu & Song, 1999)
 Gagrella werneri Suzuki, 1977
 Gagrella withi Mello-Leitão, 1944
 Gagrella yuennanensis (Roewer, 1910)
 Gagrella yodoensis Roewer, 1954

References

Harvestmen
Harvestman genera